Stefano Prizio (born 31 May 1988 in Pescara) is an Italian footballer who plays as a defender for L'Aquila on loan from Monza.

References

External links
 L'Aquila Calcio profile

1988 births
Living people
Sportspeople from Pescara
Italian footballers
Association football defenders
Delfino Pescara 1936 players
F.C. Pro Vercelli 1892 players
Celano F.C. Marsica players
A.C. Monza players
L'Aquila Calcio 1927 players
Footballers from Abruzzo